Muspa was the name of a town and a group of indigenous people in southwestern Florida in the early historic period, from first contact with the Spanish until indigenous peoples were gone from Florida, late in the 18th century.

The town of Muspa was probably on or near Marco Island, at the north end of the Ten Thousand Islands. One map placed Punta de Muspa at Cape Sable, but other maps placed it at Cape Romano, just south of Marco Island. The first recorded mention of Muspa was by Hernando de Escalante Fontaneda, who lived for many years as a captive of the Calusa until his rescue in 1566. Fonteneda named Muspa in two different lists (in his Memoir and Memorial) of towns subject to the Calusa chief. The position of the name on the lists implies that Muspa was somewhere on the southwest coast of Florida between the Calusa capitol, believed to have been Mound Key, and Cape Sable. Depositions given by Franciscan missionaries expelled by the Calusa Chief in 1697 also place Muspa on or near Marco Island.

Marco Island is in the Ten Thousand Islands district of the Glades culture area, as defined in archeology. Around 1300, pottery and artifact styles on Marco island changed to become very similar to those of the Caloosahatchee culture, practiced by the Calusa people to the north, indicating a close alliance with or absorption by the Calusa.

Muspa was an important sub-chiefdom under the Calusa chief. In 1623 Muspa was named by the Spanish as one of five places in southern Florida they searched for treasure that may have been recovered by Florida Indians from the wrecked treasure fleet of 1622. When the Franciscan missionaries were expelled from the Calusa capital in 1697, they were escorted to the Florida Keys by the Chief of Muspa.

Muspa, along with all Calusa territory, was subject to frequent raids early in the 18th century by Muscogee and Yamasee people allied with English colonists in the Province of Carolina. Refugees from all of the indigenous peoples of southern Florida tried to flee to Cuba. The Chief of Muspa was among 270 refugees who arrived in Cuba in 1711. Along with most of the other refugees, he died there shortly afterwards.

The indigenous peoples of southern Florida, including the Muspa, were largely gone by the time Florida was transferred from Spain to Britain in 1763. People living in the area of Charlotte Harbor in the 18th century and early 19th century were called "Muspa", and it was long assumed that they were remnants of the Calusa. Indians living in the area were associated with Spanish-Cuban fishing ranchos, and historians have now concluded that, at least in the 19th century, most of those people were descendants of Muscogean people, who elsewhere in Florida became known as Seminoles.

See also
Key Marco

Citations

References

Native American tribes in Florida
Spanish Florida